Yvonne Trevino (born 18 January 1967), is an Arizona Native and former Women's kickboxing and boxing champion from Peoria, Arizona, United States.

Background
Trevino was popular among boxing and kickboxing fans during the 1990s, especially in the Southwestern United States and in her native home state of Arizona. Her popularity led her to have a loyal following as well. Trevino modeled the meaning of dedication and discipline along with the desire to succeed through the Martial Arts discipline and Women's Boxing.

Trevino grew up the third child in a family of four. As children for entertainment they would always come up with outdoor activities that were often sport challenges and physical obstacles courses that kept them actively competitive with each other around the home. Trevino athletic potential was noticed early by her fourth grade school teacher Ms. Gehring (Phoenix Suns Photographer), who encouraged Trevino to ask her parents permission to stay after school and participate in sports. Trevino said being involved in sports was a good turning point in her life it kept her focused, disciplined and out of trouble. Growing up Trevino had known about her Uncle Frank Rojo and her Cousin Alex Rojo both having Amateur Boxing careers. As well as her cousins Robert Vasquez and Sensei Larry Vasquez running Valley Kenpo Karate Martial Arts gym. Trevino’s family members Aunt Lucina Trevino Diaz and her Brother Sal Trevino had personal influence throughout her career.

Married young while attending college on athletic scholarship, Trevino unexpectedly became a divorced single parent, then later a serious custody battle over her daughter. As a single working parent Trevino watched a women's match on TV and was intent on mastering a new physical challenge. She talked her way into some pretty tough gyms. On one occasion a head trainer matched Trevino with an advanced fighter who was told to go hard on her. When the fighter exposed an opening Trevino said she got the living air kicked out of her. It took all her strength to stand back up gasp for air, regain her composure and not walk out defeated. It convinced Trevino to work harder on strategy and improving her defense. Later impressed with her courage the same gym owner offered her a fight contract where the percentage taken was not going to be in her best interest (without any sponsorships or endorsements, financial backing), nothing in comparison to the lucrative contacts of today. While most gyms were preparing guys for the golden gloves competitions with dreams of Olympic gold medals and future lucrative professional boxing careers. Trevino could only imagine the possibilities for women to display their pugilist talent, not only in competing but training others, who love to stay in shape.

Trevino searched for training that was diverse in both hand skills and kickboxing styles. She began training at Fairtex Muay Thai Camp in Chandler Arizona under fighters/trainers, such as Wayne Gregory, Burnkerd Faphimai,Phicheat Arunleung, Chris Cariaso and Sky Sithbunkerd. While training vigorously and competing in both Muay Thai Kickboxing and Boxing events, Trevino earned her first WIBF flyweight World Boxing title and later IMTO International Muay Thai Kickboxing title. Trevino said it was the best time in her early career to be working with such a diverse fight team. After several years the Fairtex Muay Thai Camp unexpectedly closed doors. Despite the struggle to continue training and staying in Arizona to address personal court custody battle, Trevino choose to commute to Las Vegas and trained briefly under both Jeff and Roger Mayweather at The United Champions Gym. This prepared her for ABC Wide World of sports WIBF title defense against Brenda Rouse. Now in a contract dispute with a Las Vegas manager, Trevino found herself in another legal battle to have the contract severed. Taking several fight purses to recoup her finances Trevino moved forward.

The mid and into late 1990s there were several factors that plagued women fighters over the years, the lack of lucrative payouts made it impossible for women fighters to pursue their passion for the sport. The lack of mainstream media exposure made most fighters unknown to the general public, and without marketing endorsements. Trevino found herself in a struggle to focus while continuing to pursue her passion in Boxing and Kickboxing matches, working a full-time job, defending her personal court battles took it toll and she found herself losing several world titles. Trevino felt if she could not apply herself 100% then retirement was obvious. After having spent nearly ten years in the fight arena. Trevino can confidently look back and is extremely proud of being not only a pioneer in the fight industry but an inductee of the International Womens Boxing Hall of Fame.

Career
According to State Boxing Commission rulings only registered licensed boxers who participated in sanctioned boxing matches were recognized professional bouts. Kickboxers were known as Martial Artist and matches were not recognized in combination with sanctioned boxing records. The documentation presented reflects boxing commissioned sanctioned bouts and known kickboxing recorded matches combined.

Yvonne Trevino first became known as "the terminator" in the early 1990 kickboxing scene competing in her first kickboxing match against fighter Lamour Myriah on May 15, 1993 in Phoenix Arizona. Trevino immediately entered another kickboxing match on May 25, 1993 winning against a well known tough Tucson Arizona fighter Lonnie Shelby. On June 19, 1993 in California in a kickboxing match Trevino went on defeating well known martial artist Cynthia Prouder in a decision. On July 10, 1993 both Trevino and Lonnie Shelby rematched each seeking a chance at earning an Arizona State Championship Kickboxing title with the bout ending with Trevino winning by decision. Then on Aug 28,1993 in Arizona Trevino was scheduled to fight Yvonne Chavez in a local kickboxing match. But Chavez was a no show, so the promoter matched Trevino by weight against an up-and-coming New Mexico male fighter with Trevino winning by controversial decision in a bout later to be considered a Kick Boxing exhibition and not a recognized sanctioned fight.

On September 18, 1993, an invitation as a last-minute replacement fighter Trevino immediately joined the professional women's boxing ranks with a surprising four-round decision win over Chris Kreuz in Davenport, Iowa. On November 19, 1993 Trevino determined to build her fight record by winning a kickboxing bout against Lapin Padilla for the United States IKBA International Kickboxing Association title. In her second boxing bout, against the stunt double debutante Bridgett Riley, with a decision win over Trevino in Laughlin, Nevada on April 8, 1994. A year later on April 20, 1995, at the Aladdin Casino in Las Vegas, Nevada Trevino was invited for an opportunity to fight in the first all women's card for the new WIBF Women's International Boxing Federation in her third boxing bout. Trevino caused what perhaps could be described as women's boxing first major upset, technically knocking out the popular and well known Germany fighter Regina Halmich ringside doctors stopped the fight after Regina suffered a major cut under her eye from a four-round, knock down action. Trevino had suffered a broken left hand in the first round worried the fight would be stopped she continued on and became the new WIBF world Flyweight champion. On January 11, 1994 in a kickboxing match against California fighter Fredia Gibbs who was really stunned early in the bout continued battle as the match ended with a controversial decisioned win favoring Gibbs. On August 27, 1994 in Burbank California Trevino excepted another kickboxing rematch against Fredia Gibbs, as the bell rang it appeared Trevino reached out to touch gloves but was unexpectedly hit and never gained her composure in the remaining round, the fight was stopped and Gibbs sealed the win. On Jan 17,1995 Trevino met for the first time the explosive Korean fighter Kym Messer in an action packed kickboxing match with Messer winning the match that was stopped in the 9th round. On November 25, 1995 Trevino headed to Las Vegas Nevada to fight in a Master Toddy's production for a Muay Thai kickboxing match defeating UK opponent Anne Quinlan with a devastating knee to the face damaging the UK fighters nose and forcing the match to be stopped by ringside doctors in the second round. A month later on December 9, 1995 at the Table Mountain Casino in Fresno California under the Lizarraga under card, Trevino accepted a re-match against Messer for the (IMTO) International Muay Thai Organization Championship title belt, sanctioned by B John productions. Trevino winning the match by decision and returning to the Fairtex Camp with her first Women's Muay Thai Championship Title, defeating the tough Kym Messer who said she refuses to recognize this fight as a loss on her record.

June 1, 1996 in Las Vegas in a Top Rank promotions as undercard for the Azumah Nelson III Vs Jessie James Leija. Trevino and her next opponent Delia Gonzalez, a well-known boxer from Chama, New Mexico, who also fought previously in the Women's 1995 WIBF Championship bout as a Bantamweight. Disappointingly both fighters Delia and Yvonne were refused a sanctioned world championship bout by then manager(Jimmy Finn) of the WIBF organization. Unfortunately, the two female opponents went on without a sanctioned fight to a four-round technical draw (tie). On September 21, 1996 in Laughlin Nevada a boxing match with Christine Sullivan of Texas the fight being stopped in the third round Trevino winning by TKO decision. Inactive for about a year Trevino excepted a nationally televised bout on ABC Wide World of Sport matched against Brenda Rouse a fighter from the stable of well known professional boxer Tommy Morrison the bout being stopped in the first round after Rouse against the ropes failed to respond to a flurry of punches. On April 29, 1997 in Tempe Arizona her home state pitted her in a boxing match against fighter Akiya Griggs who seemed to be overwhelmed, the bout being stopped in the first round with Trevino winning the match by the knock out (TKO).

On May 17, 1997 during a new all women's card in Indio California against Jolene Blackshear Trevino had several questionable knock downs ruled as slips, despite obtaining a first round Technical knockout win over Blackshear who suffered a major cut under her eye after review of the fight footage during the battle the cut was suffered by an inadvertent elbow. On August 2, 1997 in Biloxi Mississippi a boxing match with Suzanne Riccio Trevino obtain an opportunity at a vacant IFBA World Bantamweight title belt (Trevino disappointingly being stripped of her first 1995 WIBF flyweight title belt, by Jimmy Finn the current WIBF Sanctioning Federation) Trevino learned she was exclusive to only the WIBF Sanctioning body and not allowed to fight for any other Sanctioning body. Trevino forged ahead and went on to become the new IFBA Bantamweight World champion defeating Suzanne Riccio in a ten-round decision. Following six months of inactivity on February 15, 1998 in Biloxi Mississippi Trevino returned to the boxing ring in a title defense of her IFBA's world bantamweight championship belt against Bridgett Riley in a rematch. The bout ended with Trevino being out pointed by Riley and thus losing her current IFBA title by decision.

On August 8, 1998 at the Spirit Lake Casino in St Michael,North Dakota Trevino lost a split decision to Para Draine, who was holding the current IWBF World flyweight title. On November 17, 1998, in San Antonio, Texas, Trevino again lost a six-round unanimous decision to a well-trained Canadian Amateur boxer, Kathy Williams. On April 15, 1999 in a rematch against Delia Gonzalez in Las Vegas Nevada Trevino won a 6-round unanimous decision. Immediately following on May 28, 1999 at the Orleans Hotel in Las Vegas Nevada, a rematch against Suzanne Riccio-Major of Pittsburgh, PA with the crowd watching see-saw knock down action, with Trevino winning the bout by TKO, with the official stopping the bout as Riccio-Majors laid against the ropes failing to defend herself during a flurry of unanswered punches. After two years of inactivity, Trevino entered her last known bout on May 6, 2001, in Phoenix Arizona at the Celebrity Theatre, losing the match against a tough upcoming featherweight WIBF champion Kellsie Jeffries. Determined to turn the tide in her career, Trevino began training in the Brazilian Jui Jitsu style to refine her ground fighting technique with Absolute Competition Gym. Trevino enjoying the idea of fighters bringing all their arsenal to the octagon. Between dividing her time training, full-time employment, and fighting past contract dispute and then a very personal court custody battle over custody of her daughter. Trevino surprised many of her fans announcing her retirement, she could not continue fighting and stepping into the ring without 100% total commitment. Trevino knew being there for her daughter was more important than all the championship belts held. The importance of finding a stable work career outside of the fight arena and applying the same discipline and dedication to her work was her new quest.

Yvonne Trevino's sanctioned boxing record stands as of 9 wins, 5 losses, and 1 draw equals 15 bouts total. Trevino having earned two World Boxing Championship titles. The WIBF Flyweight World Championship Title and the IFBA Bantamweight World Championship Title including several title defenses. Trevino was never knocked out in her professional fighting career.

Yvonne Trevino Kickboxing and Muay Thai martial arts record stands as 7 wins, 3 losses, equals 10 bouts total, not counting the exhibition-win on Aug 28, 1993. Trevino having earned an Arizona State Kickboxing Title, the US State Kickboxing Title, and (IKBA) International Kickboxing Association Featherweight Title, and the first Fairtex Muay Thai Camp female to win 1995 (IMTO) International Muay Thai Organization Kickboxing bantamweight title in Fresno, California.

Kickboxing record

{{Kickboxing record start|title=Kickboxing & Muay Thai record|record=7 wins (5 (T)KOs), 3 losses,}}
|-  style="background:#cfc;"
| 1995-12-09 || Win ||align=left| Kim Messer || International Muay Thai Event  || Fresno, California, United States || Win ||   10 || || 7-3-0 ||
|-
! style=background:white colspan=9 |
|-  style="background:#cfc;"
| 1995-11-25 || Win ||align=left| Anne Quinlan ||Muay Thai event|| Las Vegas, Nevada, United States || TKO (Doctor Stoppage) || 2 || || 6-3-0
|-
|-  style="background:#fdd;"
| 1995-03-13 || Loss||align=left| Kim Messer ||ISKA event || Santa Cruz, California, United States || Loss || 9 || || 5-3-0
|-
! style=background:white colspan=9 |
|-  style="background:#fdd;"
| 1994-08-27 || Loss ||align=left| Fredia Gibbs || Muay Thai event || Los Angeles, California, US || Loss  ||  || || 5-2-0
|-
|-  style="background:#cfc;"
| 1993-11-19 || Win ||align=left| Lapin Padilla || IKBA US State Kickboxing || United States || TKO ||  || || 5-1-0
|-
! style=background:white colspan=9 |
|-  style="background:#fdd;"
| 1993-10-03 || Loss ||align=left| Fredia Gibbs || Muay Thai event || Simi Valley, California, United States || Loss || 5 || || 4-1-0
|-
|-  style="background:#cfc;"
| 1993-07-10 || Win ||align=left| Lonnie Shelby || Arizona State Kickboxing || Phoenix, Arizona, United States || Decision ||  || || 4-0
|-Arizona State Kickboxing
! style=background:white colspan=9 |
|-  style="background:#cfc;"
| 1993-06-19 || Win ||align=left| Cynthia Prouder ||Kickboxing event || United States || Decision ||  || || 3-0
|-
|-  style="background:#cfc;"
| 1993-05-25 || Win ||align=left| Lonnie Shelby || Kickboxing Event || Tucson, Arizona, United States || TKO ||  || || 2-0
|-
|-  style="background:#cfc;"
| 1993-05-15 || Win ||align=left| Lamour Myriah || Kickboxing event || Phoenix, Arizona, United States || KO ||  || || 1-0
|-
|-
| colspan=9 | Legend''':

Professional boxing record

References

1967 births
Living people
American women boxers
People from Peoria, Arizona
Sportspeople from the Phoenix metropolitan area
Boxers from Arizona
American female kickboxers
Kickboxers from Arizona
World boxing champions
Female Muay Thai practitioners
Bantamweight boxers
21st-century American women